The Philippines men's national tennis team represents the Philippines in Davis Cup tennis competition and are governed by the Philippine Tennis Association.

The Philippines currently compete in the Asia/Oceania Zone of Group IV.  They won the Eastern Zone in 1957, 1958, 1960, and 1964, and reached the World Group Play-off in 1991.

In April 2007, businessman and sportsman Jean Henri Lhuillier, president and chief executive officer of Cebuana Lhuillier was appointed team manager of the Philippines' Davis Cup team.

History
The Philippines was set to compete at the Davis Cup in 1921 but withdrew from the tournament. The country was supposed to be represented by brothers, Francisco and Guillermo Aragon in that year. The Philippines later decided not to enter the 1923 edition after withdrawing from both 1921 and 1922 editions. The country later competed in its first Davis Cup in 1926 becoming the first Southeast Asian country to do so. American Dwight Davis, who was also Governor General of US-administered Philippines promoted the sports in throughout the archipelago during his tenure.

The country was banned in the Davis Cup for two years by the International Tennis Federation due to "long-standing governance failings" within the Philippine Tennis Association. This meant that the Philippines would not be participating in the Davis Cup starting from the 2021 season.

Last team (2020) 

 Jeson Patrombon
 Eric Jr. Olivarez
 Francis Alcantara
 Ruben Gonzales
 Alberto Lim Jr.

Results

Head to head 
Last updated: Philippines - Indonesia ; 5 February 2017
Davis Cup Team Record
(by No. of ties)

 vs  Japan 27 ties 9–18
 vs  Indonesia 11 ties 5–6
 vs  Sri Lanka 9 ties 9–0
 vs  South Korea 9 ties 4–5
 vs  Chinese Taipei 8 ties 4–4
 vs  Pakistan 7 ties 5–2
 vs  India 7 ties 3–4
 vs  Hong Kong 6 ties 6–0
 vs  New Zealand 6 ties 3–3
 vs  Thailand 6 ties 4–2
 vs  China 6 ties 2–4
 vs  Kazakhstan 4 ties 1–3
 vs  Sweden 4 ties 0–4
 vs  Malaysia 3 ties 3–0
 vs  Singapore 3 ties 3–0
 vs  United States 3 ties 0–3
 vs  Kuwait 3 ties 3–0
 vs  Vietnam 2 ties 2–0
 vs  Iran 2 ties 1–1
 vs  Australia 2 ties 0–2
 vs  Uzbekistan 2 ties 0–2
 vs  Bahrain 1 tie 1–0
 vs  Brazil 1 tie 1–0
 vs  Finland 1 tie 1–0
 vs  Myanmar 1 tie 1–0
 vs  Netherlands 1 tie 1–0
 vs  Saudi Arabia 1 tie 1–0
 vs  Syria 1 tie 1–0
 vs  Tajikistan 1 tie 1–0
 vs  Pacific Oceania 1 tie 1–0
 vs  Austria 1 tie 0–1
 vs  Italy 1 tie 0–1
 vs  Lebanon 1 tie 0–1

References:

Notes:Not games resulting to walkovers.

See also
Davis Cup
Philippines Fed Cup team

References

External links

Davis Cup teams
Tennis Davis Cup
Davis Cup